St. Theresa of Avila High School, commonly called St. Theresa,  was a private Coeducational catholic high school in Detroit, Michigan. It was a member of the Detroit Catholic High School League and was located on 8666 Quincy Street.

The school was a perennial football powerhouse in the 1930s and 1940s, having won multiple league championships.

The school closed in 1967.

References

High schools in Detroit
Defunct Catholic secondary schools in Michigan